Damian Michalski (born 17 May 1998) is a Polish professional footballer who plays as a centre-back for 2. Bundesliga club Greuther Fürth.

Career
On 29 August 2022, he was announced to be joining 2. Bundesliga club Greuther Fürth on a three-year contract, with an extension option.

References

Living people
1998 births
People from Bełchatów
Association football defenders
Polish footballers
GKS Bełchatów players
Górnik Polkowice players
Wisła Płock players
SpVgg Greuther Fürth players
Ekstraklasa players
I liga players
II liga players
III liga players
2. Bundesliga players
Polish expatriate footballers
Expatriate footballers in Germany
Polish expatriate sportspeople in Germany